Stepsister from Planet Weird is a Disney Channel Original Movie which was released in June 2000. Directed by Steve Boyum, it stars Courtnee Draper, Tamara Hope, Lance Guest, and Khrystyne Haje. Based on the book of the same name by Francess Lantz, the plot follows a teenage girl (Draper), who discovers that her mother's fiance (Guest) and her own future stepsister (Hope), are actually strange aliens from another planet hiding out on Earth.

Plot
Megan Larson is an ordinary 14-year-old girl. Her workaholic father Fred and windsurfing mother Kathy are divorced, and Megan longs for them to get back together as much as she longs for her little brother Trevor to be less annoying. But the thing she wants the most is for popular boy Cutter to be her boyfriend, so her dearest wish is to be in with the popular group.

Things begin to get out of control when her mother meets Cosmo Cola, a nice but very strange man. He has a pretty and intelligent daughter named Ariel who is even weirder than her dad. Ariel hides under her father's car when the wind blows because she is afraid of wind, talks in a sophisticated manner, wears many layers to 'protect her essence' and cannot ride a bicycle, even with training wheels and a football helmet. Mostly she complains that she hates the town where they live and wants to return to her hometown in Yukon to be with her boyfriend Fanul. Worst of all for Megan, the kids at school think that the way Ariel behaves is 'cool and revolutionary'. Her teachers believe her mannerisms are poetic, and she even gets to sit at the popular table on her first day, which attracts Cutter's attention.

What Megan does not realize is that Ariel and her father are aliens from Planet Zircalon. Because Ariel's father was a freedom fighter on their home planet, they escaped to Earth, leaving behind their home, Ariel's mother who perished in the escape, and Ariel's boyfriend Fanul who is the son of the tyrannical emperor S'Vad. On her home planet, every citizen is a gaseous bubble that floats carelessly, so Ariel is very uncomfortable with the solid objects of Earth. She hates everything on Earth: her name, the way the wind blows, food, the solid objects and the people. "Every time I look at this horrid vehicle; the rubbery flesh, the flat face, the ghastly yellow hair that grows out of this hideous skull, I can only think I am grotesque."

Ariel and Megan become enemies despite Megan's mother's engagement to Ariel's father. As Ariel and Megan realize that they both want to break up their parents, they agree on a temporary alliance to achieve their common goal. However, none of their plans work out.

After a while, Megan begins to suspect something especially unusual is occurring and discovers that Ariel and Cosmo are aliens. Fanul and S'Vad arrive to take Ariel and Cosmo home to Zircalon, but Fanul turns on his father after Megan, Ariel, and Cutter convince him of the benefits of freedom. As Ariel's race is vulnerable to wind, she, Megan, Cutter, Fanul, and Trevor are able to defeat S'Vad with a leaf blower and hairdryers.

After S'Vad is defeated, Cosmo marries Kathy, Megan and Fanul develop feelings for each other while Ariel and Cutter do the same, and Ariel and Megan become best friends. Fanul plans to return home and take over as ruler after the death of his father, but also plans to make changes to the way things are run and to grant the people freedom. Fanul promises to return to Earth occasionally to visit Megan. Megan and Ariel realize that even though they are from different worlds they are a lot alike.

Cast
 Courtnee Draper as Megan Larson, Kathy's daughter and Ariel's future stepsister
 Tamara Hope as Ariel Cola, Cosmo's daughter and Megan's future stepsister
 Lance Guest as Cosmo Cola, Kathy's fiance and Ariel's father
 Khrystyne Haje as Kathy Larson, Megan's mother and Cosmo's fiance
 Vanessa Lee Chester as Michelle "Mikey", Megan's best friend
 Cecelia Specht as Serena Soo, Heather Hartman's best friend
 Myles Jeffrey as Trevor Larson, Megan's annoying little brother
 Lauren Maltby as Heather Hartman, a popular girl in Megan's school
 Tiriel Mora as Fooop, S'Vad's doppelganger
 Henry Feagins as Fanul, Ariel's boyfriend, but later becomes Megan's eventual boyfriend
 Tiriel Mora as S'Vad, a tyrannical emperor of Planet Zircalon and main antagonist
 Tom Wright as Cutter Colburne, a popular boy whom Megan has a crush on

Reception
Common Sense Media rated the film 4 out of 5 stars.

References

External links
 

Disney Channel Original Movie films
2000 television films
2000 films
Films shot in Australia
American science fiction comedy films
American teen comedy films
Films about extraterrestrial life
Films about shapeshifting
Films based on American novels
American science fiction television films
Films with screenplays by Chris Matheson (screenwriter)
American comedy television films
Films directed by Steve Boyum
2000s American films